Raksha (Sanskrit रक्षा) is a Sanskrit word associated with protection. Raksha and its various derivatives which occur predominantly in the Vedas and their many auxiliary texts means – to protect, guard, take care of, tend, rule, govern, to keep, not to divulge, to preserve, save, keep away from, spare, to avoid, to observe or to beware of, an evil spirit, a demon, an imp and is the root of numerous words. In the Vedas it refers to the evil tendencies that continuously afflict humanity.

Literature 
In Sukta 104 of the VII Mandala of the Rig Veda in the 22nd mantra addressed to Indra beginning – इन्द्रासोमा तपतं रक्ष उब्जतं न्यर्पयतं वृषणा तमोवृधः, Rishi Vasishthahmaitravaruni states:-

उलूकयातुं शुशुलूकयातुं जहि श्वयातुमुत कोकयातुम |
सुपर्णयातुमुत गृध्रयातुं दृषदेव प्र मृण रक्ष इन्द्र || २२ ||

which mantra has been translated by T.H.Griffith in the following manner to mean destroy :-

"Destroy the fiend shaped like an owl or owlet; destroy him in the form of a dog or cuckoo." 
"Destroy him shaped as an eagle or as a vulture as with a stone, O Indra, crush the demon."

Rishi Vasishthahmaitravaruni refers to the Rakshas (रक्षस्) as groups of evil  tendencies (vritti), having base animal qualities stemming from the rajas and tamas (gunas), modes of being: viz. 1) ulookavritti,  owl tendency, attachment, 2) shushlookavritti, wolf tendency , anger, 3) shvavritti, dog tendency, envy, 4) kokavritti, goose tendency, lustfulness, 5) suparnavritti, kite tendency, ego, and 6) grddhavritti, vulture tendency, greediness.  Taking the cue, in the very first Sukta- prayer intended to root out the evil tendencies of the wicked, unsympathetic and uncharitable exploiters of humanity,   Yajurveda mantra I.7 reads :-

प्र्त्युष्टं रक्षः प्र्त्युष्टा अरातयो निष्टप्तं रक्षो निष्टप्ता अरातयः |
उर्वन्तरिक्षमन्वेमि ||

"The Rakshah group of Rakshas is burnt to ashes, aratayo, reduced to ashes, the former is fired out and the latter too," 
"I am keeping the vast antariksha."

Rati means gati which means motion, movement and advancement; Aratayo means agati or inactivity, slothfulness and inertness. When evil tendencies are destroyed, inactivity disappears and capability to do worthy acts is instilled, misfortune is washed away, then, a person's actions lead him/her to the gain of wealth, and the feeling of benevolence comes to the fore. The worshipper by praying – "I am keeping the vast antariksha" -- seeks to become united with all the capabilities to act (and) thus united he becomes filled up with feelings of benevolence. Heating up of the Rakshas indicates one becoming pure and sanctified whereas the Aratis are meant to be heated up by the fire of true awakening.

References

Rigveda
Hindu philosophical concepts
Vedanta
Upanishadic concepts
Yoga concepts
Tantra
Sanskrit words and phrases